The 1992 Italian Grand Prix (formally the Pioneer 63º Gran Premio d'Italia) was a Formula One motor race held at Monza on 13 September 1992. It was the thirteenth race of the 1992 Formula One World Championship.

The 53-lap race was won by Brazilian driver Ayrton Senna, driving a McLaren-Honda, after he started from second position. It was Senna's third victory of the season. Briton Martin Brundle finished second in a Benetton-Ford, with German teammate Michael Schumacher third.

Pre-race
As at the last Grand Prix in Belgium, there was no pre-qualifying session as entrants dropped out. The Brabham team had not returned after missing the last race, and Andrea Moda had been excluded from Formula One by FISA for "conduct prejudicial to the sport" after a succession of chaotic events throughout the season so far. The team arrived at Monza but were refused entry. This left 28 cars in the qualifying sessions.

Angered and hurt by this, Mansell decided to announce his retirement despite being told minutes before the press conference that he would be able to partner Prost.

Qualifying

Qualifying report
Nigel Mansell took his eleventh pole position of the season in his Williams-Renault, with Ayrton Senna alongside him on the front row in his McLaren-Honda. On Ferrari's home soil, Jean Alesi took third, ahead of Riccardo Patrese in the second Williams. Gerhard Berger was fifth in the second McLaren, with Michael Schumacher sixth in the Benetton. The top ten was completed by Ivan Capelli in the second Ferrari, Thierry Boutsen in the Ligier, Martin Brundle in the second Benetton and Bertrand Gachot for Larrousse.

The two non-qualifiers were Christian Fittipaldi of Minardi, and Jordan driver Stefano Modena.

Qualifying classification

Race

Race report
Berger had an electrical problem on the grid, and was forced to start the race from the pit lane in the spare car.
 
At the start Mansell took the lead ahead of Senna who just managed to stay ahead of Alesi then Patrese and Capelli. Schumacher had a poor start selecting a wrong gear and then hit a Ligier from behind at the first chicane. He had to pit to replace the nose and front wing at the end of the first lap. Patrese managed to overtake Alesi at the start of lap 2. The opening laps saw both Berger and Schumacher recovering many positions from the back of the field and overtaking a number of slower cars.

At the front Mansell opened a gap with Senna unable to match his pace. The positions were Mansell, Senna with Patrese closing down on him and then the two Ferraris of Alesi and Capelli. Next Martin Brundle managed to overtake Capelli and moved into 5th position. Lap 12 proved disastrous for the Ferrari team with both cars retiring, Alesi, who was in fourth, due to a mechanical problem and Capelli spinning off at the Parabolica with electronic problems. On lap 14 Patrese overtook Senna and moved into second. Meanwhile, Berger pitted for new tyres and dropped back again. On lap 17 the order was Mansell in first, ten seconds in front of Patrese, with Senna two seconds further behind. Fourth was Brundle, some 28 seconds behind Mansell and then Boutsen and Herbert over 40 seconds behind Mansell. On lap 18, Herbert retired from sixth with an engine issue.

On lap 20 Patrese suddenly appeared in the lead as Mansell let his team-mate pass. The order was Patrese followed closely by Mansell and Senna in third. Schumacher overtook Boutsen and moved into fifth place. Positions at lap 27 were: Patrese, Mansell, Senna, Brundle, Schumacher and Boutsen. As the lead trio lapped the slower cars of Berger and Comas, Mansell continued to stay very close to Patrese and Senna tried his best not to lose contact with the two Williams cars; in fact he closed up on Mansell momentarily when the Williams had to take evasive action passing Comas at the Roggia. On lap 41 Mansell slowed through the Ascari bends and coasted into the pits with gearbox failure from loss of hydraulic pressure and had to retire. Classification at lap 44 was: Patrese, Senna, Brundle, Schumacher, then Berger and de Cesaris both a lap down. Patrese led comfortably until six laps from the end he suffered a hydraulic problem, forcing him to slow down and concede the lead to Ayrton Senna. In the closing stages of the race Senna allowed his teammate Berger to unlap himself. Patrese limped to the end of the race and finished fifth.

Senna won the race in what proved to be his last win with a Honda-powered car. The other places on the podium went to the two Benettons of Brundle and Schumacher.

Race classification

Championship standings after the race
Bold text indicates the World Champions.

Drivers' Championship standings

Constructors' Championship standings

References

Italian Grand Prix
Italian Grand Prix
Grand Prix
Italian Grand Prix